Sky Motel is the fourth studio album by the American musician Kristin Hersh, released in 1999.

Production
Recorded at New Orleans' Kingsway Studio, the album was produced by Trina Shoemaker.

Critical reception
Salon called the album Hersh's "most technically complex, aglow with feedback cascades, pulsing drum loops and sampled nature sounds that suggest a vast, empty night." The Salt Lake Tribune thought that "'A Cleaner Light', 'Echo' and 'Caffeine' are destined to be classics in the Hersh catalog, offering wrenching lyrics that make Jewel or Alanis Morissette's so-called poetry sound like processed, angst-by-numbers in comparison."

Track listing

Credits
Vocals and most of the music are performed by Kristin Hersh. Drums on tracks 1, 5 & 7 are played by Carlo Nuccio who also provides a drum loop for track 8. Drum loops for tracks 3 & 11 are provided by David Narcizo.

References 

1999 albums
Kristin Hersh albums
4AD albums